Newburn may refer to:

People 
Harry K. Newburn (1906-1974), American educator and universities administrator
Thomas Newburn (1918-2003), Irish first-class cricketer
Tim Newburn (born in 1959), British academic, specialising in criminology

Place

Australia 
Newburn, former area or Perth, now Perth Airport

United Kingdom 
Newburn, civil parish of Newcastle upon Tyne
Newburn, civil parish of Fife in Scotland

Other 
(2955) Newburn, minor planet of the asteroid belt